Scrub Island may refer to:

 Scrub Island, Anguilla
 Scrub Island (British Virgin Islands)